Xanthograpta trilatalis is a moth of the family Noctuidae first described by Francis Walker in 1866. It is found in India.

References

Acontiinae